KJHR-LP (100.1 FM) is a radio station licensed to Teton Village, Wyoming, United States. The station is currently owned by Teton Village Association.

See also
List of community radio stations in the United States

References

External links
 

JHR-LP
Community radio stations in the United States
JHR-LP
Radio stations established in 2004
2004 establishments in Wyoming